Whitewater or Wild water refers to rapids in rivers.

Whitewater or White water may also refer to:

Communities

Guyana
 Whitewater, Guyana

United States
 Whitewater, California
 Whitewater, Colorado
 Whitewater, Indiana
 Whitewater, Kansas
 Whitewater, Missouri
 Whitewater, Montana
 White Water, Oklahoma
 Whitewater, Wisconsin
 University of Wisconsin–Whitewater
 Whitewater (town), Wisconsin, adjacent to the city of Whitewater
 Whitewater Shaker Settlement, a former Shaker settlement Hamilton County, Ohio
 Whitewater Township (disambiguation)

Geography
 Whitewater Canyon (disambiguation)
 Whitewater Glacier, a glacier in state of Oregon, United States
 Whitewater River (disambiguation)
 List of whitewater rivers

Facilities
 Whitewater (POW camp), a camp for German POW's during WW2 in Manitoba, Canada
 Whitewater Canal, (formerly) a shipping waterway built in Indiana in the middle 1800s
 Whitewater Valley Railroad, a scenic historic railroad in southeastern Indiana

Recreation
 Whitewater recreation in British Columbia

Water Parks
 Six Flags White Water, a water park in Cobb County, Georgia
 U.S. National Whitewater Center, a whitewater rafting and training center in Charlotte, North Carolina
 White Water Branson, a water park in Branson, Missouri 
 WhiteWater World, a water park along the Gold Coast, Australia
 White Water Bay (disambiguation), water parks in various states

Other parks and recreation
 White Water (pinball), 1992 Williams pinball machine with a whitewater rafting theme
 Whitewater Ski Resort, near Nelson, British Columbia, Canada
 Whitewater State Park, state park in state of Minnesota, United States
 Whitewater Memorial State Park, state park in state of Indiana, United States

Other
 Whitewater controversy, the controversy involving the Whitewater Development Corporation and former U.S. President Bill Clinton
 WhiteWater West, a water slide manufacturing company based in Canada
 Gold Rush: White Water (2018 TV series) a TV limited series spin-off of Gold Rush: Alaska
 Whitewater Brewery, Northern Ireland

See also
 Wild Water (disambiguation)
 White (disambiguation)
 Water (disambiguation)
 Rapid (disambiguation)
 Agua Blanca (disambiguation), meaning 'white water'
 Aksu (disambiguation), meaning 'white water'
 Whitewater rafting